Helen Glover (born April 28, 1955 in Honolulu, Hawaii) was a survival swim instructor for the United States Navy when she first appeared on Survivor: Thailand. Her father served for the United States Marine Corps. She attended four different high schools in various US states. She was previously a self-employed caterer, a waitress, and a lifeguard. She resides in Middletown, Rhode Island, with her husband, one daughter, one son who served as a US Marine captain, and one stepdaughter.

At the start, Glover was chosen by the oldest female contestant of Thailand, Jan Gentry, for the Chuay Gahn tribe. After betraying other players, Glover became the thirteen person voted off unanimously by three other remaining competitors, placing fourth and making her the sixth jury member. Eventual winner Brian Heidik formed the secret alliance with other remaining players Jan Gentry and Clay Jordan. Heidik believed Glover to be "a bigger threat" and badgered Gentry into voting Glover out. Glover was voted the "third most[-]popular contestant" of the Thailand season per an online poll conducted by CBS.

Glover revealed in her March 11, 2004, column of The Providence Journal that a contestant voted off the game would "receive a meal, shower, room and a visit from the staff psychiatrist". CBS emailed to her, saying that the column violated an agreement prohibiting contestants from revealing "methods of production" of the series. Nonetheless, CBS would allow contestants to discuss "what's already been broadcast or mak[e] predictions". In attempt, Glover agreed to let CBS review her columns before publication. However, the Journals policies prohibited submitting works to "institutions outside the newspaper" for approval, so the Journal decidedly dropped her column.

From 2005 to August 2013, Glover was a morning talk show host for an AM radio station WHJJ and then soon established her own talk show, where she expressed her "conservative" and "provocative" views about controversial topics, like immigration.

References

Survivor (American TV series) contestants

1955 births
Living people
American conservative talk radio hosts